Statler and Waldorf: From the Balcony is a multi-award-winning webshow starring the Muppet characters Statler and Waldorf which ran biweekly on Movies.com from June 2005 until September 2006. The series produced 34 episodes and featured many Muppet characters — both well-known classics and newly created characters. The two elderly curmudgeons would discuss upcoming films, watch the latest movie trailers and share the week's "balconism" from their theater box.

Many of the webisodes featured a segment (or segments) featuring other Muppet characters — for example, Pepe the King Prawn often reviewed the recent DVD releases or gave remote reports; and fictional movie trailers or commercials starring other Muppet characters were also commonly seen. Many established Muppet characters appeared — including Rowlf the Dog, Johnny Fiama, the Swedish Chef, Bobo the Bear, Dr. Teeth, Animal, Sam Eagle, and Sweetums. Plus many new recurring and one-time gag characters would appear in segments, sketches and parodies. Several new characters that frequented the series include Larry and Oliver, Lester Possum, Ted Thomas, Stan and Louie, the Hollywood Pitchmen, the Blimp, Loni Dunne and a pair of musical performers.

Production
From the Balcony was produced by Movies.com in association with Disney's The Muppets Studio and Hirsch Productions.

A test pilot was briefly available online in February 2005. The pilot featured Statler and Waldorf in a movie theater watching, rating and commenting on the latest trailers for The Pacifier and Constantine, additionally Pepe the Prawn appeared to give a rundown on the latest DVD releases. The pilot did not feature the classic balcony set seen in later episodes, a "Balconism" and other regular features the series would later include. The puppeteers on the pilot were Victor Yerrid (Waldorf) and Drew Massey (Statler and Pepe). The pilot was removed from Movies.com in the spring of 2005 and has not been officially released or reposted since.

In early June 2005, Movies.com announced that From the Balcony would soon become a regular feature of the site. Biweekly episodes started appearing on Movies.com beginning on June 26. The first eight episodes featured regular Muppet performers Dave Goelz, Steve Whitmire and Bill Barretta performing the cast of Muppets in each episode. However, starting with episode 9, and continuing until the end of the series, Yerrid and Massey returned to take over the main puppeteering duties on the project.

Yerrid commented on his and Massey's role in the series in a 2007 interview stating: 

The opening of each episode started with a quick first-person perspective traveling through the El Capitan Theatre. The song "Hey a Movie!" from The Great Muppet Caper was used as the theme song in early run of the series before being replaced with an original instrumental composition for later episodes (starting with episode 5). The show originally was produced in the traditional 4:3 (1.33:1) aspect ratio, but starting with episode 15, and continuing for the rest of the series' run, the picture switched to a 16:9 (1.78:1) widescreen format.

Through the 15-month run of the series, the show produced 34 episodes. Aside from the biweekly episodes, the series produced sets of promotional Halloween and Oscar clips that were released to television news syndicates for incorporation in news broadcasts to promote the series. Statler and Waldorf also appeared from the set of From the Balcony in a promotional tie-in to introduce the films for ESPN Classic's Reel Classics Extra beginning in October 2005. The characters and balcony set were also featured in a public service announcement for the Will Rogers Institute in late 2005.

In October 2006, after the 34th episode of the webshow debuted online, Movies.com set the following message via the "Balcony Bulletin" mailing list (an e-mail mailing list that would alert subscribers when a new episode was posted):

Although the show was said to only be on a "hiatus", as of January 2014, no information on a possible return of the show or the production of new episodes has surfaced, nor have Statler and Waldorf appeared in any other parts of Movies.com. At a public appearance in June 2007, Dave Goelz mentioned that they were working on several projects - including new Muppet webisodes. However it was unclear if he meant a return of From the Balcony or the creation of a new web series.

Due to the acquisition of Movies.com by Comcast's Fandango, the series is no longer available at Movies.com.

While there has been no word of upcoming From the Balcony episodes, The Muppet Newsflash: A Jim Henson News Blog announced on Sept. 17, 2009, that Statler and Waldorf will release a book titled From the Balcony in 2010.

Awards and recognitions
In August 2006 TIME Magazine named the series among "the 25 Sites We Can't Live Without" (sharing the ranks with eBay, Amazon.com, Google and Wikipedia).

From The Balcony won a Silver Telly at The Telly Awards in 2006, for best use of comedy. Movies.com was awarded the highest-level Silver Telly Award for "Best use of Humor in a Non-Broadcast Video" for From the Balcony's creative spoof of the film Dukes of Hazzard.

In April 2007, the series was nominated for, and won, a Webby Award. The series' nomination, in the "Comedy: Long Form or Series" category, was Movies.com's first ever nomination for a Webby. Public voting ran on the Webby Awards website throughout April 2007 to decide the winners of the award. On May 1, 2007 it was announced that From the Balcony was the winner of the "People's Voice 2007: Webby for Best Comedy Long Form or Series" due to the show gaining the most votes out of the five the nominees in the category.

Episodes
{| class="wikitable" style="width:100%;"
|-
! Episode !! Originally posted !! Balconism !! Guests
|-
|| Test Pilot || February 25, 2005 || none || Pepe the King Prawn
|-
| colspan="4" style="background:#fff;"| Statler and Waldorf take a look at The Pacifier and Constantine however the pair is unable to get a consistent rating scale to rank the films. Pepe the King Prawn pops in to give a rundown on the latest DVD releases - Saw, I Heart Huckabees, Donnie Darko and Taxi.
|-
|| Episode 1 || June 26, 2005 || Dej-HAH-vous || Pepe the King Prawn
|-
| colspan="4" style="background:#fff;"| Statler and Waldorf take a look at the trailers for War of the Worlds and Bewitched. The pair rank each film on their "Snooze-O-Meter" noting how far into the film they will fall asleep. Plus the two toss it over to Pepe the King Prawn to talk about the newest titles on DVD - Miss Congeniality 2, Coach Carter and Hostage.
|-
|| Episode 2 || July 6, 2005 || KILL-dren || Rowlf the Dog
|-
| colspan="4" style="background:#fff;"| Statler and Waldorf preview Charlie and the Chocolate Factory and Fantastic Four. The two rank the films on the "old man driving scale" noting how fast they would drive to (or away from) the film. Rowlf the Dog stops by the set of The Wedding Crashers to give tips on how to be a wedding crasher.
|-
|| Episode 3 || July 18, 2005 || Expenda-BILL || Johnny Fiama
|-
| colspan="4" style="background:#fff;"| Statler and Waldorf preview Stealth and The Island. Plus Johnny Fiama interviews Keanu Reeves (through edited footage).
|-
|| Episode 3: Bonus Clip || July 19, 2005 || none|| Pepe the King Prawn
|-
| colspan="4" style="background:#fff;"| Upset that Johnny Fiama took his place in episode 3, Pepe releases a "top-secret" video giving his take on the week's new DVD releases.
|-
|| Episode 4 || August 3, 2005 || COUGH-in || The Swedish Chef
|-
| colspan="4" style="background:#fff;"|  Statler and Waldorf review The Dukes of Hazzard and Deuce Bigalow: European Gigolo. Plus the Swedish Chef makes a pair Daisy Duke jeans.
|-
|| Episode 5 || August 18, 2005 || Doggie-DAR || Pepe the King Prawn
|-
| colspan="4" style="background:#fff;"| Statler and Waldorf review The 40-Year-Old Virgin and Red Eye; plus Pepe is on the street to talk about Sin City, Beauty Shop and A Lot Like Love on DVD.
|-
|| Episode 6 || September 1, 2005 || TRAVOLTED || Pepe the King Prawn
|-
| colspan="4" style="background:#fff;"| Statler and Waldorf host "The Balc-y Awards" covering the best (or in their case, worst) in summer movies.
|-
|| Episode 7 || September 14, 2005 || Lucky BLAST-ard || Bobo the Bear
|-
| colspan="4" style="background:#fff;"| Statler and Waldorf review Just Like Heaven and Corpse Bride. The two also share a rare Star Wars: Episode III audition tape from Bobo the Bear.
|-
|| Episode 8 || September 29, 2005 || Prev-EULOGY || Pepe the King Prawn
|-
| colspan="4" style="background:#fff;"|  Statler and Waldorf review Into the Blue and Two for the Money. Plus Pepe is on the red carpet of Flightplan where he interviews such celebrities as Brent Sexton, Peter Sarsgaard, Michael Irby, Constance Marie, Isaiah Washington, Jodie Foster, Erika Christensen and several other guests.
|-
|| Episode 9 || October 12, 2005 || CON-mercial || Dr. Teeth and Animal
|-
| colspan="4" style="background:#fff;"| Statler and Waldorf review Doom and Elizabethtown. Plus Dr. Teeth and Animal talk about Shopgirl's love triangle.
|-
|| Episode 10 || October 27, 2005 || Coinci-DANCE || The Weather Guy
|-
| colspan="4" style="background:#fff;"| Statler and Waldorf review Jarhead and The Legend of Zorro. The Weather Guy checks in with the report for the movie The Weather Man.

Note: The Weather Guy is a recycled version of a generic puppet used in the Muppet Meeting Films.
|-
|| Halloween Press Clips || October 28, 2005 || RUN-derwear || No guest
|-
| colspan="4" style="background:#fff;"| In a series of videos not released on the official website, Statler (dressed as an Egyptian mummy) and Waldorf (dressed as Count Dracula) give a "Halloween Film Countdown". These clips were released to news syndicates to air as promotion for the web series.
|-
|| Episode 11 || November 11, 2005 || BLONDE-tourage || Sam Eagle
|-
| colspan="4" style="background:#fff;"| Statler and Waldorf review ''Get Rich or Die Tryin' and Harry Potter and the Goblet of Fire. Sam the Eagle gives an editorial on the Johnny Cash movie Walk the Line.
|-
|| Episode 12 || November 26, 2005 || WEAK-quel || Stan and Louie
|-
| colspan="4" style="background:#fff;"| Statler and Waldorf review Rent and In the Mix. Plus the theater rats Stan and Louie give their take from "Below the Balcony".
|-
|| Episode 13 || December 10, 2005 || HACK-tors || Ivan the Villager, Sweetums, Clive Focus, Penguins
|-
| colspan="4" style="background:#fff;"| Statler and Waldorf review The Chronicles of Narnia: The Lion, the Witch and the Wardrobe and King Kong. Plus Ivan the Villager and Sweetums beg for Hollywood's mercy and Clive Focus gets shots of the stars of March of the Penguins.
|-
|| Episode 14 || December 24, 2005 || YULE LOG-jam || Larry and Oliver
|-
| colspan="4" style="background:#fff;"| Statler and Waldorf give their Christmas film countdown from a decked out balcony. Plus Larry and Oliver act out every Christmas movie ever made.
|-
|| Episode 15 || January 7, 2006 || Fluctu-WEIGHT || Assorted Whatnots, Animals, and Aliens, Indiana, Sam Eagle, French Critic
|-
| colspan="4" style="background:#fff;"| Statler and Waldorf showcase some of the international rip-offs of their webshow, while Indiana complains about being a fly-over state (with a disclaimer from Sam Eagle).Note: The French Critic is a recycled version of a generic puppet used in the Muppet Meeting Films and was previously used as the Weather Guy in episode 10.
|-
|| Episode 16 || January 20, 2006 || WIN-jury || Alvy Mellish, Lester Possum
|-
| colspan="4" style="background:#fff;"| Statler and Waldorf review Big Momma's House 2 and Underworld: Evolution. Alvy Mellish weighs in on Match Point and Lester Possum takes to the streets to find out what the average movie goer is thinking.
|-
|| Episode 17 || February 4, 2006 || Romantic KARMA-dy|| Deliveryman, Loni Dunne, Ted Thomas, Mr. Movie, Billy
|-
| colspan="4" style="background:#fff;"| Statler and Waldorf review Firewall and The Pink Panther. Meanwhile, Ted Thomas and Loni Dunne discuss the Oscar nomination announcements. And Mr. Movie gives Billy a lecture on how movies are made.Note: The puppet used for Billy is a recycled and redressed version of Annie DeLoo from The Wubbulous World of Dr. Seuss. Ted Thomas is a recycled version of Gimley's Boss from the Muppet Meeting Films.
|-
||Episode 18 ||  February 18, 2006 || It's OVER-ture || Oscar envelope, detective, Sam Eagle, Lester Possum
|-
| colspan="4" style="background:#fff;"| Statler and Waldorf host their big Oscar prediction episode. A detective interrogates an Oscar envelope and Lester Possum goes to the street to hear people's views on who will win at the Oscars.
|-
||Oscar Press Clips || March 2, 2006 || none || No guest
|-
| colspan="4" style="background:#fff;"| In a series of videos not released on the official website, Statler and Waldorf are interviewed on their Oscar predictions. These clips were released to news syndicates to air as promotion for the web series.
|-
||Episode 19 ||  March 4, 2006 || PROM-blematic || Ted Thomas, Hugo, Spamela Hamderson, assorted animals
|-
| colspan="4" style="background:#fff;"| Statler and Waldorf are off to the beach to review Failure to Launch, Ultraviolet, and 16 Blocks. Ted Thomas interviews Hugo, the star of The Shaggy Dog. Plus a commercial for "Muppets Gone Wildlife".Note: Morton the Beaver and Melanie the Mink from Jim Henson's Animal Show appear in the "Muppets Gone Wildlife" commercial.
|-
||Episode 20 ||  March 18, 2006 || ACT-lete || Penguins, Larry and Oliver
|-
| colspan="4" style="background:#fff;"| Statler and Waldorf review She's the Man, Inside Man and V for Vendetta. The Muppet penguins star in a promo for March Madness of the Penguins and Larry and Oliver are back to reenact every sports movie ever made in another installment of "Film Crew Theater".
|-
||Episode 21 ||  April 1, 2006 || Hide and SEQUEL || The Hollywood Pitchmen, Young Statler and Waldorf
|-
| colspan="4" style="background:#fff;"| A pair of anxious Hollywood pitchmen try to sell new ideas of movie sequels and Statler and Waldorf show an old (black-and-white and silent) episode of "From the Balcony".
|-
||Episode 22 ||  April 15, 2006  || PET-amorphosis || Stan and Louie
|-
| colspan="4" style="background:#fff;"| Statler and Waldorf show their American Idol audition and Stan and Louie are back for another view from "Below the Balcony".
|-
||Episode 23 ||  April 29, 2006  || THESPIAN-age || Tom Cruise Muppet, Tom Cruise's assistant, Loni Dunne
|-
| colspan="4" style="background:#fff;"| Statler and Waldorf show sneak-peeks at the trailers for Mission: Impossible 4: Ridiculously Impossible and Mission: Impossible 5: Impossibly Impossible; plus Loni Dunne interviews an excited Tom Cruise.
|-
||Episode 24 ||  April 29, 2006 || LAUGHTER-math || Rejected Mutants (The Blimp, The Procrastinator, The Defroster, Beaverine, The Invisible Twins, and Scorn), musical performers
|-
| colspan="4" style="background:#fff;"| Statler and Waldorf showcase some rejected mutant auditions for X-Men including The Blimp, The Procrastinator, The Defroster, Beaverine, The Invisible Twins, and Scorn. The duo also take a look at a trailer for a made-up film, Poseidon: The Musical.Note: The Blimp is a recycled version of Mr. Big Head from the Muppet Meeting Films. The puppet used for Scorn is a recycled version of one of Statler and Waldorf's nurses from Muppets Tonight.
|-
||Episode 25 || May 27, 2006  || Opening FREAK-end || Waldorf's replacement
|-
| colspan="4" style="background:#fff;"| Inspired by The Break-Up, Statler and Waldorf go their separate ways. While Waldorf is at home alone, Statler brings in a new co-host to review The Omen.
|-
||Episode 26 || June 10, 2006 || STARING wheel || Manny Folds, The Swedish Chef
|-
| colspan="4" style="background:#fff;"| Statler and Waldorf, with the help of Manny Folds, talk about all the summer car films. The duo gets the balcony pimped out; and The Swedish Chef makes "Nacho Libres".
|-
||Episode 27 ||  June 24, 2006  || Armed FARCES || Ted Thomas, Craig Kent, Superman Muppet
|-
| colspan="4" style="background:#fff;"| Statler and Waldorf review An Inconvenient Truth. Ted Thomas interviews Clark Kent's cousin Craig Kent where mistakes him for Clark Kent. Plus Superman returns... a DVD.Note: Craig Kent is a recycled version of Mr. Movie from episode 17.
|-
||Episode 28 || July 7, 2006   || Yo HO HUM || James Lipton Muppet, Polly Wanna Cracker, Long Joel Silver
|-
| colspan="4" style="background:#fff;"| Statler and Waldorf look for buried treasure in the balcony after talking about Pirates of the Caribbean: Dead Man's Chest. "Inside the Actors Studio" takes gets up close with a staring pirate's parrot. Plus Long Joel Silver advertises the "Movies for the Marooned Box Set".Note: The puppet from Long Joel Silver is a recycled version of the Deliveryman from episode 17. The puppet for Polly Wanna Cracker is a recycled version of Alfonso D'Bruzzo from The Muppet Show and Muppets Tonight.
|-
||Episode 29 ||  July 22, 2006    || MAD-aptation || Tom Cruise Muppet, David Hasselhoff Muppet
|-
| colspan="4" style="background:#fff;"| David Hasselhoff and Tom Cruise star as Statler and Waldorf in the big screen adaptation of From the Balcony.
|-
||Episode 30 ||  August 4, 2006  || HELL-titude || Bunnies, sheep, birds
|-
| colspan="4" style="background:#fff;"| Statler and Waldorf have some problems with the camera as they showcase many Snakes on a Plane knockoffs - such as Bunnies on a Balloon and Sheep on a Submarine.Note: Molly the Albatross and Milton the Blue-footed Booby from Jim Henson's Animal Show appear in the "Snakes on a Plane" knockoffs segment.
|-
||Episode 31 || August 18, 2006  || In-FAD-uation || Ted Thomas Sr., George Lucas Muppet, Woody Allen Muppet, alien
|-
| colspan="4" style="background:#fff;"| Statler and Waldorf are on vacation, so the producers treat viewers to From the Balcony's last good episode - an episode from 1977. Ted Thomas Sr. interviews rising director George Lucas, and a younger Statler and Waldorf take a look at what Close Encounters of the Third Kind would have been like if Woody Allen directed.Note: The alien from "Close Encounters of the Third Kind" is a recycled version of an alien puppet from Brats of the Lost Nebula.
|-
||Episode 32 ||  September 2, 2006  || FLICK-tion || Coach Gruesome, Flopsy, Larry and Oliver
|-
| colspan="4" style="background:#fff;"| Statler and Waldorf's "Back to School Special". Larry and Oliver return to reenact every high school movie ever made in another installment of "Film Crew Theater". Plus Flopsy prepares to play in the big football game.Note: The puppet for Coach Gruesome is a recycled version of the Luncheon Counter Monster from The Muppet Show.
|-
||Episode 33 ||  September 16, 2006  || POP-coronary || Caspar Von Blimpman, The Maltese Falcon, musical performers
|-
| colspan="4" style="background:#fff;"| Statler and Waldorf showcase a film noir parody starring Statler as Dashiell Chander. The two critics also show off a clip from another upcoming musical about going to the movies.
|-
||Episode 34 || September 20, 2006  || OS-carred || Jimmy Pureisle, The Hollywood Pitchmen
|-
| colspan="4" style="background:#fff;"| Statler's new intern Jimmy quickly outgrows his coffee fetching job and rises to the high heights of fame. The Hollywood pitchmen return to pitch wild prequels to Jimmy. Soon Jimmy's 15 minutes of fame are up. In a twist ending, Jimmy, in hope of a comeback, buys the balcony and takes over the show.
|}

List of balconisms
A list of all the "balconisms" presented by Statler and Waldorf throughout the series:ACT-lete: An athlete who attempts to act in movies but really should just stick to their sport.Armed FARCES: When the army is rendered useless in a Sci-Fi or action movie, and the true hero turns out to be an average Joe.BLONDE-tourage: When the cool girl in a teen movie is surrounded by several dumb sidekicks who will do anything she says.Coinci-DANCE: When the music starts playing, everyone breaks out in a perfectly choreographed dance that they all know.CON-mercial: When the studio puts out a misleading trailer, that cons viewers into the theater.COUGH-in: When a main character coughs in the first few minutes of a movie, and you know they'll be dead by the end.Dej-HAH-vous: When all of the funny parts of a movie have already been shown in the trailer.Doggie-DAR: The innate ability of the family dog to sense an evil man in their company even when the humans are completely oblivious.Expenda-BILL: The nameless character who always goes on secret missions and is always the first to die. (see also: redshirt)
FLICK-tion: A modern-day high school flick that is loosely based on a classical work of fiction.
Fluctu-WEIGHT: When an actor gains or loses a large amount of weight to suit an upcoming role.
HACK-tors: Cut-rate actors who replace big stars in cheap sequels to their hit movies.
HELL-titude: A horror film that takes place at a high altitude (e.g. mountain, plane,)
Hide and SEQUEL: When actors make sure they will not be found in the sequels to their previous movies.
In-FAD-uation: When Hollywood tries to make money by doing movies about the latest cultural trends.
It's OVER-ture: The music they play at the awards show when they want the acceptee to shut up and get off the stage.
KILL-dren: The uncute kids in horror movies.
LAUGHTER-math: When the aftermath of a disaster movie is so laughable, it practically ruins the whole film.
Lucky BLAST-ard: The main character of an action movie who can run, jump, swim or drive just one step faster than the fireball of a huge explosion.
MAD-aptation: When a TV show is adapted into a movie, but it stinks so much that it angers the loyal fans.
Opening FREAK-end: When a horror movie's release date coincides with its subject matter.
OS-carred: When a person is unable to get anymore work after winning an Oscar.
PET-amorphosis: When a movie character suddenly finds himself turned into the family pet.
POP-coronary: A medical condition that develops when you see how expensive things are at the concession stand.
Prev-EULOGY: When movie studios cram the whole movie into the preview and kill any chance of people going to see it.
PROM-blematic: When most of the problems in a teenage comedy come back to the characters at the prom.
Romantic KARMA-dy: Where the main character unexpectedly finds love while helping others with their relationships.
RUN-derwear: When a female in a scary movie runs away from the killer and for some reason is always in her underwear.
STARING wheel: When someone driving a car in a movie ends up staring at the passenger instead of watching the road.
THESPIAN-age: When an award-winning actor is cast as a villain in a spy thriller.
TRAVOLTED: When one key film role rescues an actor's career from years of struggle and puts them back on the map.
WEAK-quel: A sequel that comes so long after the first movie and nobody really cares.
WIN-jury: When the star of a sports movie receives an injury that hurts his ability to play, but overcomes it and finds a way to win in the end.
Yo HO HUM: How Hollywood felt about pirate movies before the Pirates of the Caribbean franchise became such a big hit.
YULE LOG-jam: The glut of big movies that comes out right around Christmas.

Reel Classic Extra

Starting on August 28, 2005 (and continuing for 19 weeks), Statler and Waldorf hosted ESPN Classic's Reel Classics Extra, a weekly sports-themed movie programing block, with antics from the balcony. The brief introductory clips were filmed as part of production for Statler and Waldorf: From the Balcony - using the same puppets, sets, crew. Aside from introducing the films, the clips heavily promoted the webshow with on-screen pop-up advertisements saying "for more Statler & Waldorf go to movies.com". An archive of these introductions was added to the From the Balcony website afterwards in 2006; they remain part of the show's video collection at Movies.com.

Statler and Waldorf's 19 special "Reel Classic Extra" intros were for the following films:
{| cellspacing="0" cellpadding="0" class="" style="background:transparent;
|-
|  style="width:50%; vertical-align:top;"|Eight Men OutHoosiersHustleLet It RideOne on OneRollerballSemi-ToughThe Black StallionThe ScoutVictory|  style="width:50%; vertical-align:top;"|North Dallas FortyAmerican FlyersThe Fish That Saved PittsburghThreeSearching for Bobby FischerCobbFast BreakBlue ChipsThrough the Fire''
|}

Credits

Muppet performers
 Steve Whitmire - Statler (episodes 1–8)
 Dave Goelz - Waldorf (episodes 1–8)
 Drew Massey - Statler (episodes 9–34), Animal (episode 9), The Weather Guy (episode 10), Sam Eagle (episodes 11, 15, 18, and 33), Stan the Rat (episodes 12, and 22), Ivan the Villager (episode 13), Clive Focus (episode 13), Oliver (episodes 14, 20, and 32), Alvy Mellish (episode 16), Mr. Movie (episode 17), Ted Thomas (episodes 17, 19, and 27), Oscar Envelope (episode 18), Hollywood Pitchman #1 (episodes 21 and 34), Tom Cruise Muppet (episodes 23, and 29), Beaverine (episode 24), Manny Folds (episode 26), James Lipton Muppet (episode 28), Long Joel Silver (episode 28), Ted Thomas Sr. (episode 31), Woody Allen Muppet (episode 31), Coach Gruesome (episode 32)
 Victor Yerrid - Waldorf (episodes 9–34), Dr. Teeth (episode 9), Louie the Rat (episodes 12, and 22), Sweetums (episode 13), Larry (episodes 14, 20, and 32), The State of Indiana (episode 15), Lester Possum (episodes 16, and 18), Billy (episode 17), Loni Dunne (episodes 17, and 23), Detective (episode 18), Hugo the Dog (episode 19), Hollywood Pitchman #2 (episodes 21 and 34), The Blimp (episodes 24, and 33), Waldorf's Replacement (episode 25), Superman Muppet (episode 27), Craig Kent (episode 27), Polly Wanna Cracker (episode 28), David Hasselhoff Muppet (episode 29), George Lucas Muppet (episode 31), Close Encounters Alien (episode 31), Flopsy (episode 32), Jimmy Pureisle (episode 34)
 Bill Barretta - Pepe the King Prawn (episodes 1, 3, 5, 6, and 8), Rowlf the Dog (episode 2), Johnny Fiama (episode 3), The Swedish Chef (episodes 4, and 26), Bobo the Bear (episode 7)
 Alice Dinnean - Whatnot Dame (episode 33)
 Allan Trautman - Deliveryman (episode 17)

Crew
 Executive Producer: Ian Hirsch
 Cinematographer: Byron Werner
 Editor: David Tarleton
 Writers: Joe Nussbaum, Mike Pellettieri, David Young
 Director: Ian Hirsch
 Art Director: Marcus Vaughn
 Set Dresser''': Amy Mullin

References

External links
 From the Balcony news reports at The Muppet Newsflash
 Statler and Waldorf: From the Balcony at Muppet Wiki
 From the Balcony's original characters at Muppet Wiki

2005 web series debuts
2006 web series endings
The Muppets television series
Internet properties established in 2005
Video podcasts
American comedy web series